[[File:Kaja 1934-62.jpg|thumb|250px|Newspaper Kajas caption announcing the beginning of the state of protection led by General Laidoner on 14 March 1934.]]
The Era of Silence''' was the period between 1934 and 1938 (or 1940) in Estonian history. The period began with the preemptive self-coup of 12 March 1934, which the then Prime Minister of Estonia Konstantin Päts carried out to avert a feared takeover of the state apparatus by the popular Vaps Movement (a political organization of war veterans). 

Context and events
In the charged atmosphere that pervaded Europe in 1934, when Adolf Hitler and Benito Mussolini had become widely admired role models for authoritarian and nationalist movements in many other countries, most of the leaders of the democratic Republic of Estonia also viewed the possible takeover by a similar group, the Vaps Movement, as a credible and imminent threat. Claiming the existence of such an imminent threat, the then Prime Minister Konstantin Päts, using the authority of the newly adopted Constitution of 1933, proclaimed a national state of emergency on 12 March. He then appointed general Johan Laidoner, a popular leader of the War of Independence and a known opponent of the Vaps Movement's leadership, as commander of the armed forces. 

Veterans' organisations were shut down, over 400 members were arrested, and all organised political activity in the country was outlawed. All Vaps members were also purged from local governments, the civil service, and the Defence League. The lame-duck parliament immediately approved these actions.

However, when Päts decreed postponement of the elections for both State Elder and Parliament, scheduled to be held in spring 1934 according to the new constitution, opposition arose in a special session convened by the existing parliament since the constitution did not allow postponement of elections by decree. In response, he permanently postponed the session and ruled by decree until a new constitution could be drawn up and adopted. Thus, Päts' government takeover was a coup de facto but also de jure since the entire process was illegal under the constitution in effect in 1934.

Uses of term
The term "Era of Silence" was first introduced by Kaarel Eenpalu, the country's prime minister from  1938 to 1939 and a strong supporter of Päts, the Estonian head of state during that period. However, the term has been used later more often to describe the silencing of opposition to Päts' governing circle. It also reflects an apparent nationwide consensus to go along with the temporary suppression of some civil and political rights in the interests of "order" after years of political turmoil. Päts' rule was never an unduly harsh one: nearly all of those jailed in 1934 were released in 1938, and none of the former heads of state (Ants Piip, Juhan Kukk, Jaan Teemant and Jaan Tõnisson) who issued the critical Four State Elders' Memorandum in a newspaper in neighbouring Finland in October 1936, calling on Päts to immediately end the curtailment of civil and political rights and to reinstitute democratic government, were ever harassed by the Päts' government. When parliamentary elections were held in 1938 under the new constitution of 1937, the opposition candidates won 16 seats (out of 64) in the lower house of parliament.

The "Era of Silence" is usually considered to have ended with either the new Estonian constitution coming into force on 1 January 1938 or with the parliamentary elections held in February 1938. Some sources extend their definition of "the era" until the Soviet invasion and occupation of Estonia in June 1940.

See also

 1934 Estonian coup d'état

References

Sources
 Miljan, Toivo. Historical Dictionary of Estonia'', pp. 196–97. Scarecrow Press, 2004, 
 Estonica: 1918–1940. Republic of Estonia

Further reading
 Frucht, R. C. (2005). Eastern Europe: An introduction to the people, lands, and culture / edited by Richard Frucht. Santa Barbara, Calif: ABC-CLIO. Page 78+

1930s in Estonia
1930s coups d'état and coup attempts
Interwar Baltic state coups d'état and coup attempts
Political history of Estonia
Authoritarianism